Nicholas Morse (died 28 May 1772) the great-grandson of the British statesman and revolutionary Oliver Cromwell and served as the last President of Madras before the Battle of Madras and the French occupation of Fort St George and its surroundings in 1746.

Morse's presidency was short and was characterised by hostilities between the British and the French. This hostilities culminated in 1746 by the occupation of Madras by the French under Bertrand François Mahé de La Bourdonnais ending Morse's short tenure.

Morse's daughter Emilia was married to Henry Vansittart, Governor of Bengal from 1759 to 1764. Nicholas Morse is buried in St Mary's Church in Madras.

A website on slave trade has named Nicholas Morse along with another Governor of Fort St George William Gyfford as a prominent slave-trader.

See also
 List of colonial Governors and Presidents of Madras Presidency

References

External links 

History of Tamil Nadu
Presidents of Madras
1772 deaths
Year of birth unknown
1746 in India